Richard Evett Bishop (May 30, 1887 – February 1975) was an American painter. He was born in Syracuse, New York.  His work was part of the painting event in the art competition at the 1932 Summer Olympics.

References

External links
Bird etchings at the USA National Gallery of Art
Artwork by Richard Evett Bishop 

1887 births
1975 deaths
20th-century American painters
American male painters
Olympic competitors in art competitions
People from Syracuse, New York
20th-century American male artists